The Young Doctors is a 1961 drama film directed by Phil Karlson and starring Ben Gazzara, Fredric March, Dick Clark, Ina Balin, Eddie Albert, Phyllis Love, Aline MacMahon, George Segal, and Dolph Sweet.

The film is based on the 1959 novel The Final Diagnosis by Arthur Hailey.  Ronald Reagan was the narrator in the film.

Plot 
David Coleman (Ben Gazzara) is a young doctor hired by a hospital's pathology department. The head of the department, Dr. Joseph Pearson (Fredric March), sees Coleman as a rival, and they fight over many medical issues. Coleman falls in love with Cathy Hunt (Ina Balin), a student nurse  at the hospital, who develops a tumor in her knee. Pearson believes that the tumor is malignant and that the leg should be amputated, but Coleman disagrees. Coleman orders three blood tests on Mrs. Alexander (Phyllis Love), an expectant mother whose baby may have hemolytic disease, but Pearson believes that the tests are excessive and cancels the third test. Mrs. Alexander is married to a young intern at the hospital (Dick Clark), who, along with Coleman,  tried to push for the third test.  When the baby is born seriously ill, Dr. Charles Dornberger (Eddie Albert), Mrs. Alexander's OB/GYN, berates Pearson and conducts a blood transfusion to save the baby's life. Pearson's future at the hospital becomes uncertain, and he resigns. Coleman has changed his mind about Cathy's tumor and agrees with Pearson's decision, while Pearson says that Coleman reminds him of himself when he was young and urges him not to let hospital bureaucracy wear him down.

Cast 
Fredric March as Dr. Joseph Pearson 
Ben Gazzara as Dr. David Coleman 
Dick Clark as Dr. Alexander 
Ina Balin as Cathy Hunt 
Eddie Albert as Dr. Charles Dornberger 
Phyllis Love as Mrs. Elizabeth Alexander 
Edward Andrews as Jim Bannister 
Aline MacMahon as Dr. Lucy Grainger 
Arthur Hill as Tomaselli 
Rosemary Murphy as Miss Graves 
Barnard Hughes as Dr. O'Donnell 
George Segal as Dr. Howard 
Dolph Sweet as Police Car Driver

No Deadly Medicine and The Final Diagnosis
Arthur Hailey wrote a two part television play for Studio One called "No Deadly Medicine". It was broadcast in 1957 starring Lee J. Cobb, William Shatner and James Broderick.

Doubleday commissioned Hailey to adapt the script into a novel, The Final Diagnosis, published in 1959. "The quality remains high" wrote the New York Times.

Production
Film rights were bought by Dick Clark, then best known for Bandstand who took the project to the producing team of Laurence Turman and Steve Tillman (it was their first film together). Finance was obtained from United Artists.

Jeffrey Hunter was sought for the lead. Phil Karlson who had just been fired off The Secret Ways agreed to direct.

Filming started on January 9, 1961. Filming took two months, with studio work at the Production Centre, location work at Poughkeepsie and exteriors shot at Vassar Brothers Hospital. Many of the cast were taken from the New York stage.

The movie was made with the co operation and approval of the American Medical Association.

References

External links

See also 
 Ronald Reagan films

1961 films
1961 drama films
American drama films
American black-and-white films
1960s English-language films
Films about physicians
Films about surgeons
Films scored by Elmer Bernstein
Films directed by Phil Karlson
Films based on Canadian novels
Films set in hospitals
United Artists films
Films based on works by Arthur Hailey
1960s American films